Schankweiler is a municipality in the district of Bitburg-Prüm, in Rhineland-Palatinate, western Germany.

The Hartberg megalithic tomb, a prehistoric site, is near Schankweiler.

References

Bitburg-Prüm